Manea railway station  is on the Ely–Peterborough line in the east of England and serves the village of Manea, Cambridgeshire. It is  measured from London Liverpool Street (via  and ), and is situated between Ely and  stations.

History

Services 

These services use British Rail Class 755 bi-mode units.

These use British Rail Class 170 diesel units.

Greater Anglia services stop at Manea on Sundays (twelve services a day, six each way). The first service is the 09:03 to Peterborough, the last is the 20:11 to Colchester via Ely and Ipswich.

The station has benefitted from an on-site ticket machine since late October 2018, situated on the south side of the line (next to the down line for trains travelling towards March and Peterborough).

References

External links 

Railway stations in Cambridgeshire
DfT Category F2 stations
Former Great Eastern Railway stations
Railway stations in Great Britain opened in 1847
Railway stations served by CrossCountry
1847 establishments in England
Fenland District
Greater Anglia franchise railway stations